The Design 1021 ship (full name Emergency Fleet Corporation Design 1021) was a steel-hulled cargo ship design approved for production by the United States Shipping Boards Emergency Fleet Corporation (EFT) in World War I. They were referred to as the "Long Beach-type" as they were built by Long Beach Shipbuilding Company in Long Beach, California. Three ships were completed for the USSB in 1918 and 1919.

References

Bibliography

External links
 EFC Design 1021: Illustrations

Standard ship types of the United States